The Greater North Central Francophone Education Region No. 2, known in French as the Conseil scolaire Centre-Nord (CSCN), is one of Alberta's four French language school boards. French language education is intended for children who are eligible under section 23 of the Canadian Charter of Rights and Freedoms. The CSCN is a composite board, operating both public and catholic francophone schools in Beaumont, Camrose, Edmonton, Fort McMurray, Jasper, Legal, Lloydminster, Red Deer, Sherwood Park, St. Albert. Stony Plain  and Wainwright. The CSCN receives funding for all students from the provincial Government of Alberta.

History
In 1993, the Government of Alberta adopted a bill amending the School Act to comply with Mahe v. Alberta (1990), a leading Supreme Court of Canada decision on the minority language education rights under section 23 of the Canadian Charter of Rights and Freedoms. The district was created in 1994 under section 223.3 of the School Act under the name Regional Authority of the North Central Francophone Education Region No. 4 (since changed to Greater North Central Francophone Education Region No. 2). It is one of four French school boards in Alberta.

Governance
According to the School Act (2001), the seven members of the Board of Trustees are elected to represent francophone communities in central and northern Alberta. The composite regional Authority's mandate is to protect the linguistic and confessional rights of section 23 holders.

The CSCN updates its list of electors by carrying out a census, as required. Results of the census determine the proportion of Public school Trustees and Catholic school Trustees to be elected to the Board. The Catholic trustees constitute a separate entity – Conseil scolaire catholique Centre-Nord – according to section 255.4 of the School Act (2001). Based on the 2011 census, there are two Public school trustees and five Catholic school trustees.

Size
In 2016-2017 school year, there were approximately 3,200 students attending 19 schools in total: 9 elementary schools, 1 elementary/junior high school, 1 junior high school, 2 junior/senior high school, 5 elementary/junior/senior high schools, and 1 senior high school.

The CSCN employs approximately 350 teachers and professionals.

A twentieth school, an elementary school, opened in Stony Plain in 2022.

Schools

See also
List of Alberta school boards

References

External links
Conseil scolaire Centre-Nord’s official website
Alberta Education 
Study in Alberta

School districts in Alberta
Roman Catholic schools in Alberta
Education in Edmonton

French-language school districts in Canada